The 2018 Kansas gubernatorial election took place on November 6, 2018, to elect the next governor of Kansas. Democratic nominee Laura Kelly won the election, defeating Republican nominee Kris Kobach and independent candidate Greg Orman.

Incumbent Republican Governor Sam Brownback was term-limited and could not seek reelection to a third consecutive term. On July 26, 2017, Brownback was nominated by President Donald Trump to serve as United States Ambassador-at-Large for International Religious Freedom. He was confirmed by the United States Senate on January 24, 2018. Brownback resigned the governorship on January 31 and was succeeded by Lieutenant Governor Jeff Colyer. Colyer was eligible to seek a full term and announced his candidacy prior to becoming Governor of Kansas. In the August 7 primary, Colyer ran against CPA and incumbent Insurance Commissioner Ken Selzer, Topeka doctor and 2006 Republican Kansas gubernatorial nominee Jim Barnett, and Kansas Secretary of State Kris Kobach.

On August 7, 2018, Kobach defeated Colyer in the Republican gubernatorial primary by an initial margin of 191 votes, a lead that increased to 361 votes by August 14, although discrepancies in some counties needed resolution and provisional and absentee ballots may not have been counted in some counties. Colyer conceded the Republican nomination after the final votes were tallied, in which Kobach's margin grew slightly. Democratic State Senator Laura Kelly easily won the Democratic nomination. Businessman Greg Orman, who finished second as an independent in the 2014 U.S. Senate race against incumbent Republican Pat Roberts, also ran for governor as an independent candidate.

Given that Kansas is the only state which has no gubernatorial statutory qualifications whatsoever in its constitution, seven teenagers, including one who has never even been to the state of Kansas, ran for the office in this election cycle. A debate took place on September 5 between the three candidates that consistently polled above 5%. Polls in late August had Laura Kelly and Kris Kobach running close with  Greg Orman polling in the single digits.

Kelly's win continued a streak of party turnover for Governor of Kansas, as Kansas has not elected two consecutive governors of the same party since Republican William Avery succeeded fellow Republican John Anderson Jr. following the 1964 election, and neither major party has held the governorship for longer than eight consecutive years since Republican John McCuish left office in 1957.

Republican primary

Candidates

Nominated
 Kris Kobach, Secretary of State of Kansas and nominee for KS-03 in 2004
 Running mate: Wink Hartman, businessman and candidate for KS-04 in 2010

Eliminated in primary
 Jim Barnett, former state senator, nominee for governor in 2006 and candidate for KS-01 in 2010
 Running mate: Rosemary Hansen, Barnett's wife
 Jeff Colyer, incumbent Governor and candidate for KS-03 in 2002
 Running mate: Tracey Mann, incumbent Lieutenant Governor
 Patrick Kucera, businessman
 Running Mate: Patricia Reitz
 Tyler Ruzich, high school student
 Running mate: Dominic Scavuzzo, high school student
 Ken Selzer, Kansas Insurance Commissioner
 Running mate: Jen Sanderson, businesswoman
 Joseph Tutera Jr., high school student
 Running mate: Phillip Clemente, high school student

Withdrew
 Wink Hartman, businessman and candidate for KS-04 in 2010 (ran for lieutenant governor) Hartman joined Kris Kobach's campaign as his Lieutenant Gubernatorial candidate.

Endorsements

Polling

Results

Democratic primary

Candidates

Nominated
 Laura Kelly, state senator
 Running mate: Lynn Rogers, state senator

Eliminated in primary
 Arden Andersen, physician
 Running mate: Dale Cowsert, businessman
 Jack Bergeson, high school student
 Running mate: Alexander Cline, high school student
 Carl Brewer, former Mayor of Wichita
 Running mate: Chris Morrow, former mayor of Gardner
 Josh Svaty, former Kansas Secretary of Agriculture and former state representative
 Running mate: Katrina Gier Lewison, Manhattan-Ogden USD 383 Board of Education member, veteran

Withdrew 

 Jim Ward, Minority Leader of the Kansas House of Representatives

Declined 

 Paul Davis, former Minority Leader of the Kansas House of Representatives and nominee for governor in 2014 (running for KS-02)

Endorsements

Polling

Results

Independent candidates

Candidates

On the ballot
Rick Kloos
Running mate: Nathaniel Kloos, son of Rick Kloos
Greg Orman, businessman and candidate for the U.S. Senate in 2014
Running mate: John Doll, state senator

Write-in
 Aaron Coleman, college student

Failed to qualify
 Ilan Cohen, high school student from Maryland
 Max Correa, college student from North Carolina 
 Joe Larry Hunter, former inmate
 Andy Maskin, New York City Advertiser
Running mate: Scott Goodwin, Connecticut Advertiser
 Victor Redko, McGill University student
 Jared Rogers, University of Pennsylvania student
 Nicholas Schrieber, college student from Delaware
Running mate: Matthew Ueckermann, college student from Maryland
 Conner Shelton, college student from Pennsylvania

Libertarian convention

Candidates

Nominated
 Jeff Caldwell, executive committee member for the Libertarian Party of Kansas
Running mate: Mary Gerlt

Withdrew 
 Thomas Padgett

General election

Predictions

Debates

Endorsements

Polling

with Kris Kobach and Laura Kelly

with Kris Kobach and Greg Orman

with Jeff Colyer

with generic Republican, Democrat, and Independent

Results

By congressional district
Kelly won 2 of 4 congressional districts, including one that was carried by a Republican in the concurrent congressional elections.

Maps

References

External links
Candidates at Vote Smart
Candidates at Ballotpedia

Debates
GOP Primary Debate, February 17, 2018

Official campaign websites
Jeff Caldwell (L) for Governor
Ilan Cohen (I) for Governor         Archive
Aaron Coleman (I) for Governor   Archive
Laura Kelly (D) for Governor
Rick Kloos (I) for Governor
Kris Kobach (R) for Governor 
Greg Orman (I) for Governor

Gubernatorial
2018
2018 United States gubernatorial elections